Halin may refer to:

Halin, Poland
Halin, Somaliland
Hanlin, Burma